Jaggampeta Assembly constituency is a constituency in Kakinada district of Andhra Pradesh, representing the state legislative assembly in India. It is one of the seven assembly segments of Kakinada Lok Sabha constituency, along with Tuni, Pithapuram, Kakinada Rural, Peddapuram and Kakinada City. Jyothula Naga Veera Venkata Vishnu Satya Marthanda Rao is the present MLA of the constituency, who won the 2019 Andhra Pradesh Legislative Assembly election from YSR Congress Party. , there are a total of 211,402 electors in the constituency.

Overview 
It is part of the Kakinada Lok Sabha constituency along with another six Vidhan Sabha segments, namely, Tuni, Pithapuram, Kakinada Rural, Peddapuram, Kakinada City, and Prathipadu.

Mandals 

The four mandals that form the assembly constituency are:

Members of Legislative Assembly

Election results

Assembly Elections 2009

Assembly elections 2014

Assembly elections 2019

See also 
 List of constituencies of the Andhra Pradesh Legislative Assembly

References 

Assembly constituencies of Andhra Pradesh